Coproporphyrinogen III is a metabolic intermediate in the biosynthesis of many compounds that are critical for living organisms, such as hemoglobin and chlorophyll.  It is a colorless solid.

The compound is a porphyrinogen, a class of compounds characterized by a hexahydroporphine core with various side chains. The coproporphyrinogens have the outermost hydrogen atoms of the core replaced by four methyl groups  (M) and four propionic acid groups  (P).  In coproporphyrogen III, the order around the outer ring is MP-MP-MP-PM. For comparison, coproporphyrinogen I has them in the sequence MP-MP-MP-MP.  heme.

Biosynthesis and metabolism
In the main porphyrin biosynthesis pathway, coproporphyrinogen III is derived from uroporphyrinogen III by the action of the enzyme uroporphyrinogen III decarboxylase:

The conversion entails four decarboxylations, which turn the four acetic acid groups  into methyl groups , with release of four carbon dioxide molecules.

Coproporphyrinogen III is further used as a substrate for the enzyme coproporphyrinogen III oxidase which oxidizes and further decarboxylates it to protoporphyrinogen IX.

References

Tetrapyrroles